Stenalia brunneipennis is a beetle in the genus Stenalia of the family Mordellidae. It was described in 1856.

Subspecies
Stenalia brunneipennis brunneipennis Mulsant, 1856
Stenalia brunneipennis unistrigosa Chobaut, 1924

References

brunneipennis
Beetles described in 1856